The 2016–17 Detroit Titans men's basketball team, also known as Detroit Mercy, represented the University of Detroit Mercy during the 2016–17 NCAA Division I men's basketball season. The Titans, led by first-year head coach Bacari Alexander, played their home games at Calihan Hall as members of the Horizon League. They finished the season 8–23, 6–12 in Horizon League play to finish in seventh place. As the No. 7 seed in the Horizon League tournament, they lost to Milwaukee in the first round.

Previous season
The Titans finished the 2015–16 season 16–15, 9–9 in Horizon League play to finish in sixth place. They defeated Youngstown State in the Rirst Round of the Horizon League tournament to advance to the Second Round where they lost to Wright State.

On April 1, 2016, head coach Ray McCallum was fired. He finished at Detroit with an eight-year record of 130–132. On April 22, Bacari Alexander was hired as head coach.

Departures

Incoming Transfers

Recruiting class of 2016

Roster

Schedule and results

|-
!colspan=9 style=| Exhibition

|-
!colspan=9 style=| Non-conference regular season

|-
!colspan=9 style=| Horizon League regular season

|-
!colspan=9 style=| Horizon League tournament

References

Detroit Titans
Detroit Mercy Titans men's basketball seasons
Detroit Titans men's b
Detroit Titans men's b